The Unfortunate Importance of Beauty is a novel by Amanda Filipacchi. It was released in February 2015 by W. W. Norton & Company.

References

2015 American novels
Novels by Amanda Filipacchi
W. W. Norton & Company books